Budukh may refer to:

 Budukh people, a people of the Caucasus in Quba District, northeastern Azerbaijan
 Budukh language, the Lezgic language spoken by the Budukh people

See also
 Buduq, a village in Quba District of Azerbaijan
 Budukhshan